The flag of Senegal is a tricolour consisting of three vertical green, yellow and red bands charged with a five-pointed green star at the centre. Adopted in 1960 to replace the flag of the Mali Federation, it has been the flag of the Republic of Senegal since the country gained independence that year. The present and previous flags were inspired by French Tricolour, which flew over Senegal until 1960.

History

Under French colonial rule over Senegal, the authorities forbade the colony from using its own distinctive colonial flag because they were worried that this could increase nationalistic sentiment and lead to calls for independence.  With the rise of the decolonization movement in Africa, the French were obliged to grant limited autonomy to Senegal as a self-governing republic within the French Community.  Senegal was combined with French Sudan on April 4, 1959, to form the Mali Federation. That day, a new flag was adopted: a vertical green, yellow and red tricolour with a stylized depiction of a human being (referred to as a kanaga) on the centre band.  The federation attained independence from France on June 20, 1960.

The federation between the two former colonies did not last long and ended two months after independence.  On August 20, Senegal separated from the federation and became an independent country.  The new nation's flag kept the colours and stripes of the federation's flag, with the only change being the replacement of the kanaga with a green star.

In April 2004, the flag and its design were hoist into the public colloquium when Moustapha Niasse, then-leader of the Alliance of the Forces of Progress, hosted a press conference regarding the "modification of the election code and the set up of an independent commission to check the lawfulness of the next legislative and presidential elections." At the conference's coda, Niasse explored what he felt was "defense of the symbols of the Republic against the division threat and the offence against national unity", and produced "[a] visible replacement, on certain official documents, of the green star of the central yellow stripe of the national flag by a golden baobab", alongside what he described as "the non-performance of the national anthem during official ceremonies".

The newspaper WalFadjri reported on the same press conference with an emphasis on the alleged transmutation of the national symbology, even going so far as to entitle the feature "President Wade creates a new flag". Niasse again produced what he flaunted as an ''official document signed by the head of state...with a golden baobab instead of the green star." Niasse himself stated ""Only the Senegalese people is sovereign to decide any modification of the symbols of our Republic".

Design

Symbolism
Much symbolism and many connotations are beholden to the stripes and singular star of the Senegalese flag. From a national perspective, green is highly symbolic within all of the country's primary religions. In Islam, the country's majority religion at 94% percent of the population, the green of both the first stripe and the star represent the colour of the Prophet, Christians see the presence of green as a portent of hope, and Animists view green as representative of fecundity.

The Senegalese government offers exegesis for the presence of yellow and red as well, yellow being "the symbol of wealth; it represents the product of work, for a nation whose main priority is the progress of economy, which will allow the increase of the cultural level, the second national priority." Additionally, yellow is denoted as "the colour of arts, literature, and intellect", primarily because literature teachers in Senegal are known to wear yellow blouses. Red "recalls the colour of blood, therefore colour of life and the sacrifice accepted by the nation, and also of the strong determination to fight against underdevelopment."

Historically, the three colours represent the three political parties which merged to form Union Progressiste Sénégalaisé (Senegalese Progressist Union, now Socialist Party of Senegal, Leopold Senghor's party): green for Bloc Démocratique Sénégalais (Senegalese Democratic Bloc), yellow for Mouvement Populaire Sénégalais (Senegalese Popular Movement) and red for Parti Sénégalais d'Action Sociale (Senegalese Party of Socialist Action).

Green, yellow and red are the colours of the Pan-Africanist movement. That pattern was replicated on Senegal's flag as a sign of unity among African countries. The quinary points of the star are said to "recall the human ideogram which was displayed in the middle of the flag of the former Mali Federation".

Historical flags

Similar colours
The Pan-African colours of Senegal's flag are shared by several other countries in the region, including Cameroon, Guinea and Mali.

References

Flags introduced in 1960
Flag
Flags of Africa
National flags